Blaze is the sixth studio album by American punk rock band Lagwagon, released in 2003.

Background and recording
Lagwagon recorded with Ryan Greene in March 2002. While on the 2002 Warped Tour, the band handed out promo samplers that included two songs from the album, "Dinner and a Movie" and "Never Stops". In September, the band were writing material for their next album, which they spent November recording.

The album marked their first studio release in the five years since Let's Talk About Feelings. The absence was due to frontman Joey Cape being involved with band projects like Bad Astronaut and Me First and the Gimme Gimmes. Lagwagon did not completely disband during that time, and briefly reunited in 2002.

Release
On December 25, 2002, Blaze was announced for release in April 2003. On March 17, 2003, the album's artwork and track listing was posted online. Two days later, "Falling Apart" was posted on the label's website. Blaze was released on April 8, 2003, through Fat Wreck Chords. In April and May 2003, the band embarked on a headlining US tour, with Avoid One Thing and Yellowcard. On May 31 and June 1, the band held one-off shows that were recorded as part of the Live in a Dive series. In August and September, the band toured across Europe, which included appearances at the Reading and Leeds Festivals, and four shows as part of the Reconstruction Festival.

Reception

It was the first Lagwagon album to rank on the Billboard 200, reaching #172.

Track listing
All songs written by Joey Cape and Jesse Buglione, except where noted.  
 "Burn" - 3:15
 "E Dagger" - 2:09
 "Dancing the Collapse" - 2:16
 "I Must Be Hateful" - 3:30
 "Falling Apart" (Cape, Buglione, Chris Rest) - 2:39
 "Max Says" - 3:22
 "Billy Club" - 2:48
 "Dividers" - 2:43
 "Never Stops" - 3:34
 "Dinner and a Movie" - 2:04
 "Lullaby" - 3:49
 "Billionaire" - 2:30
 "Tomorrow Is Heartbreak" - 3:00
 "Baggage" - 4:08

This album contains 2 live videos from the Warped Tour 2002 and the music video for "Falling Apart" as enhanced content.

Personnel
Joey Cape – vocals 
Chris Flippin – guitar 
Chris Rest – guitar 
Dave Raun – drums 
Jesse Buglione – bass

References

External links

Blaze at YouTube (streamed copy where licensed)

Lagwagon albums
2003 albums
Fat Wreck Chords albums
Albums produced by Joey Cape